Gender self-identification is the concept that a person's legal sex or gender should be determined by their gender identity without any medical requirements, such as via statutory declaration.

It is a major goal of the transgender rights movement. Advocates of self-identification say that medical requirements could force trans people into undergoing surgery, are intrusive and humiliating gatekeeping, and that self-identification would make it easier for transgender people to live day-to-day without prejudice. Advocates also argue that there is no evidence that such laws have caused problems in countries where they have been introduced, such as in Ireland, where it was introduced in 2015. Self-identification is opposed by some feminists, who consider safety in places like refuges and prisons, and fairness in sports, to be adversely affected. Opponents also consider affirmation of self-identification in children with gender dysphoria to set them on a path of medical gender transition.

As of February 2023, gender self-identification, where no judge or medical expert are involved, is part of the law in 20 countries: Argentina, Belgium,  Brazil, Chile, Colombia, Costa Rica, Denmark, Ecuador, Finland, Iceland, Ireland, Luxembourg, Malta, New Zealand, Norway, Pakistan, Portugal, Spain, Switzerland and Uruguay. Proposals to introduce it have proved controversial in some countries, such as Spain and the United Kingdom. Within countries organised as federations, such as Australia, Canada and Mexico, legal gender recognition may principally fall under sub-national jurisdiction, and so may vary from province to province. Within a single jurisdiction, legal gender recognition procedures can be different for different documents, such as birth certificates or passports, and is not always the sole determinant of gender recognition in day-to-day life, such as in healthcare, access to facilities, or in personal relations. Third gender self-determination is available in India and Nepal.

Positions of international bodies
In April 2015, the Parliamentary Assembly of the Council of Europe adopted Resolution 2048 (2015), within which "the Assembly calls on Member States to ... develop quick, transparent and accessible procedures, based on self-determination ... available for all people who seek to use them, irrespective of age, medical status, financial situation or police record". In 2015, the Office of the United Nations High Commissioner for Human Rights stated that "abusive requirements as a precondition of recognition — for example, by requiring ... forced gender reassignment and other medical procedures" are "in violation of international human rights standards" and in 2018, Victor Madrigal-Borloz, the United Nations Independent Expert on Protection against violence and discrimination based on sexual orientation and gender identity, stated that "the right to self-determine one's gender was a fundamental part of a person's freedom and a cornerstone of the person’s identity" and that states' obligations included "adopting legal measures such as being based on self-determination [and] ensuring that minors have access to recognition of their gender identity".

Positions of international charities 
In 2014, Amnesty International released a report titled The state decides who I am: Lack of Legal Gender Recognition For Transgender People in Europe. In the report, Amnesty argued that many European countries had legal gender recognition laws that were based on stereotypical gender norms and that violated individuals' rights to "private and family life, to recognition before the law, to highest attainable standard of health and to be free from cruel, inhuman and degrading treatments without discrimination on 
grounds of gender identity and expression." The report further argued that "transgender people should be able to obtain legal gender recognition through quick, accessible and transparent procedures and in accordance with their own perceptions of gender identity."

To mark Transgender Awareness Week in November 2019, multinational law firm Dentons produced a report titled Only adults? Good practices in legal gender recognition for youth, written along with IGLYO, an international network of LGBT+ student and youth organisations, and the Thomson Reuters Foundation. The report examined the status of legal gender recognition for minors in several European countries, and describes itself as a "powerful tool for activists". Based on international human rights standards, the report argued that people under the age of 18 should have the right to legal gender recognition based on self-declaration, that a third gender marker should be recognised, that trans healthcare should be publicly accessible, and that discrimination based on gender identity should be illegal. The report also examined campaigns to reform legal gender recognition laws in those countries, arguing that the most successful techniques included targeting younger politicians and political parties' youth wings, emphasising the depathologisation and human rights aspects of reform, the use of individuals' stories to humanise the campaign, intervening early in the political process, and strong collaboration between groups. The report advises to "tie your campaign to a more popular reform" and continues: "This provided a veil of protection, particularly in Ireland, where marriage equality was strongly supported, but gender identity remained a more difficult issue to win public support for." The report recommends avoiding being in the news, as in Ireland where campaigners "directly lobbied individual politicians and tried to keep press coverage to a minimum".

Around the world

Africa 
Although there is no current legislation on legal gender recognition in Botswana, in the 2017 ND v Attorney General of Botswana and Another case, the High Court of Botswana ruled that the government should "ensure that procedures exist whereby all State-issued identity documents which indicate a person’s gender/sex reflect the person’s self-identified gender identity."

The Americas 

A 2018 study in BMC International Health and Human Rights found that "the majority of countries from South America allow their transgender citizens to change name and gender in legal documents with a fast, easy and inexpensive manner" and that "legislation to protect [sexual and gender minority] rights in South America have undergone fundamental and positive transformations" in the 2010s. However, the study also found that "transgender people are unable to change their gender in public records and legal documents in several Latin America and the Caribbean countries – mostly in the Caribbean and Mesoamerica." Argentina, Brazil, Chile, Colombia, Costa Rica, Ecuador and Uruguay have self-identification laws, as well as several Canadian provinces and Mexican and American states.

Argentina 
In 2012, the Ley de Género made Argentina the "only country that allows people to change their gender identities without facing barriers such as hormone therapy, surgery or psychiatric diagnosis that labels them as having an abnormality". In 2015, the World Health Organization cited Argentina as an exemplary country for providing transgender rights.

A 2018 paper in the Journal of Human Rights analysing the factors that lead to the creation of the law found that "more institutionalized group played a major role in getting the issue on the agenda, while a more radical challenger coalition was crucial in developing and advancing the ground-breaking content."

Bolivia
The Gender Identity law allows individuals over 18 to legally change their name, gender and photography on legal documents.  No surgeries, hormone therapy or judicial order are required, nevertheless, a psychological examination attesting that the petitioner consents the decision is required. The law took effect on 1 August 2016.

Brazil 
The Supreme Federal Court ruled on March 1, 2018, that a transgender person has the right to change their official name and sex without the need of surgery or professional evaluation, just by self-declaration of their psychosocial identity. On June 29, the Corregedoria Nacional de Justiça, a body of the National Justice Council published the rules to be followed by registry offices concerning the subject.

Canada 
As Canada is a federation, legal gender recognition procedures vary from province to province. At the federal level, Canadians can apply to have the gender marker on their passports changed via self-identification.

In Québec, the legal recognition process has worked on an affidavit process since 2015. In 2021, however, the Coalition Avenir Québec government introduced Bill 2, which would re-introduce a requirement for surgical procedures. After that provision provoked heavy controversy, Québec Minister of Justice Simon Jolin-Barrette announced that he would be withdrawing that requirement from the bill.

In 2017, Newfoundland and Labrador abolished the medical letter requirement, moving to a self-declaration process. In 2018, Alberta changed its legal gender recognition laws to allow people to self-declare their legal gender through an affidavit, eliminating the requirement for a letter from a psychiatrist. In 2019, Nova Scotia moved to an affidavit process, eliminating the medical letter requirement. In 2022, British Columbia eliminated the medical letter requirement for legal gender changes for adults.

There still remains barriers to legal gender recognition for people born outside of Canada. As of October 2021, half of the provinces (Alberta, British Columbia, Prince Edward Island, Ontario, and Saskatchewan), and all territories, do not offer anyone not born there the ability to change their legal gender. In November 2020, refugee claimants became able to change their legal gender federally. In March 2021, temporary residents were afforded the same right (without requiring a change to their passport).

Chile
Since 2019, the Gender Identity Law (21,120) recognizes the right to self-perceived gender identity, allowing transgender people over 14 years to change their name and gender on all official documents without prohibitive requirements. For persons over 18 years of age, the change is requested by submitting a request to the Civil Registry and Identification Service, without being required to prove hormone replacement therapy, undergo sex reassignment surgery or any medical requirements. Children under 18 and over 14 years old must complete the process before family courts and have the permission and support of their representatives. Although the request for minors does not include medical reports, it does require that it have to be accompanied by background information on the psychosocial and family context. The Law guarantees as basic principles non-pathologization, non-arbitrary discrimination, confidentiality, dignity in treatment, the best interests of the child and progressive autonomy.

Colombia
Since 2015, transgender people may change their legal gender and name manifesting their solemn will before a notary, no surgeries or judicial order required. The Colombian Government issued Decree 1227 on June 04, 2015 to simplify the process by which adults over 18 can legally change their gender. The decree, signed by the Ministry of Justice and the Ministry of the Interior, says the gender change is justified by a person's individual choice; it eliminates the requirement for psychiatric or physical examinations.

Costa Rica 
In 2016, a bill allowing transgender people to legally change their name and gender without the need for surgery or judicial permission was introduced to the Legislative Assembly. In June 2017, the bill advanced to the Human Rights Committee, and the Supreme Electoral Tribunal endorsed the bill, but it was ultimately unsuccessful.

Following a January 2018 Inter-American Court of Human Rights ruling and the 2018 Costa Rican general election, President Carlos Alvarado Quesada issued an executive decree requiring all state institutions to modify the documents and internal records of transgender people who wish to have their name, photograph or sex changed according to self-declaration. The decree applies to passports, driving licenses, ID documents, work permits, university identification, etc. In December 2018, Alvarado signed another executive order extending this right to immigrants.

Ecuador
Since 2016, Ecuadorians are allowed to change their “sex” marker in the personal identity document for a “gender” marker as masculine or feminine. The person who wants to change the word "sex" for "gender" in the identity card shall present two witnesses to accredit the self-determination of the applicant. To change the “sex” marker in the civil registry, they must have a judicial order.

Mexico 

As Mexico is a federation, legal gender recognition procedures vary from state to state.

On 13 November 2014, the Legislative Assembly of Mexico City unanimously (46–0) approved a gender identity law. The law makes it easier for transgender people to change their legal gender. Under the new law, they simply have to notify the Civil Registry that they wish to change the gender information on their birth certificates. Sex reassignment surgery, psychological therapies or any other type of diagnosis are no longer required. The law took effect in early 2015.   19 other states have followed suit. These states include: Michoacán (2017), Nayarit (2017), Coahuila (2018), Hidalgo (2019), San Luis Potosí (2019), Colima (2019), Oaxaca (2019), Tlaxcala (2019), Chihuahua (2019), Sonora (2020), Jalisco (2020), Quintana Roo (2020), Puebla (2021), Baja California Sur (2021), the State of Mexico (2021) Morelos (2021), Baja California (2022), and Sinaloa (2022)

United States 
As the United States is a federation, legal gender recognition laws vary from state to state. As of July 2021, 21 states (as well as the District of Columbia) allow the gender marker on drivers licences to be updated on a self-declaration basis and as of April 2020, 10 states allow the gender marker on birth certificates to be updated on a self-declaration basis. At the federal level, since June 2021, the gender marker on passports operates on a system of gender self-identification.

Since 2010, Arkansas has allowed change of gender on state IDs "as requested, no questions asked, no documentation required."

In 2017, the California state legislature passed California's Gender Recognition Act (SB 179), removing the requirements for a physician's statement and mandatory court hearing for gender change petitions, allowing change based on an affidavit. The Act also implemented a third, non-binary gender marker on California birth certificates, drivers' licenses, and identity cards.

Uruguay
Since 2019, transgender people can self-identify their gender and update their legal name, without approval from a judge after the approval of the Comprehensive Law for Trans Persons. Sex reassignment surgery, hormone therapy or any form of diagnosis are not requirements to alter one's gender on official documents.

Asia

India 
In India, the Supreme Court affirmed the right to self-determination in two 2014 cases. 

The Transgender Persons (Protection of Rights) Act, 2019 recognizes the right to self-perceived gender identity, thus allowing transgender people to register themselves under a third gender (transgender). Applications must be made to the District Magistrate, who can issue a certificate of identity as a Transgender Person and update all documents (Section 5-6). However, identification as male or female can only be issued once proof of gender confirmation surgery or medical intervention (Section 7). 

The Transgender Persons (Protection of Rights) Rules, 2020, lays down a simpler procedure for obtaining an identity certificate from the district magistrate. In the present Rules, there is a single form to assert either a transgender or trans-binary status. However, a medical intervention is requisite for the latter. In November 2020, the Ministry of Social Justice and Empowerment launched an online portal for changes of gender marker. In the new portal, applicants are required to register an affidavit self-declaring their third gender and subsequently receive a new identity card within 30 days.

Nepal 
In 2007, in the Sunil Babu Pant and Others v. Nepal Government court case on LGBT+ rights, the Supreme Court of Nepal legally established a gender category called "other". The Supreme Court stated that the criteria for identifying one's gender is based on the individual's self-identification. However, gender recognition laws in Nepal have since faced criticism, as they only allows gender markers to be changed from "M" (male) or "F" (female) to "O" (other). There are no provisions allowing transgender women to have an "F" marker or transgender men having an "M" marker.

Pakistan 
Under the Transgender Person (Protection of Rights) Act 2018, Pakistanis may choose to self-identify as male, female, both or neither. They may express their gender according to their own preferences, and they may have their gender identity of choice reflected on their documents, "including National Identification Cards, passports, driver's licenses and education certificates."

Europe 

As of March 2023, 11 countries have legal gender recognition procedures based on self-determination of the person: Belgium, Denmark, Finland, Iceland, Ireland, Luxembourg, Malta, Norway, Portugal, Spain and Switzerland. In France and Greece  a court permission is required.
In 2014, Amnesty International stated that "many transgender people in Europe continue to struggle to have their gender legally recognised" and that trans people "should be able to obtain legal gender recognition through quick, accessible and transparent procedures and in accordance with their own perceptions of gender identity."

Belgium 
In 2017, the Belgian federal parliament passed a law allowing people to change their legal gender via statutory declaration, without any medical intervention being required. To do so, a person must first sign a statutory declaration in front of a civil officer and then wait three months before second statutory declaration confirming the change.

Cyprus 
In 2019, a bill was drafted to allow transgender people to change their legal sex. The legislation would allow transgender people over 18 to right to change their legal gender on the basis of self-determination, without a diagnosis, hormonal treatment or sex reassignment surgery. As of October 2021, the bill was still under draft status.

Germany 
In June 2021, Germany's parliament voted down two self-identification bills. One of the bills also permitted sex reassignment surgery on children starting at age 14 regardless of parental objection and would have introduced a fine of €2,500 for misgendering. Following the 2021 German federal election, the new government, a traffic light coalition led by the Social Democratic Party and with the Free Democratic Party and The Greens, announced plans to introduce legal gender recognition via self-declaration as part of the coalition agreement. The government formally proposed a self-determination bill in June 2022.

Ireland 
On 15 July 2015, the Oireachtas passed the Gender Recognition Act of 2015 which permits an Irish citizen to change their gender on government documents through self-determination. The law does not require any medical intervention by the applicant nor an assessment by the state. Such changes are possible through self-determination for any person aged 18 or over who is ordinarily resident in Ireland and/or registered on Irish registers of birth or adoption. Persons aged 16 to 18 years must secure a court order to exempt them from the normal requirement to be at least 18.

In late-January 2018, over 1000 Irish feminists, including several groups such as the University College Dublin Centre of Gender, Feminisms & Sexualities, signed an open letter condemning a planned meeting in Ireland on UK Gender Recognition Act reforms organised by a British group opposing the reforms. The letter stated that "Trans people and particularly trans women are an inextricable part of our feminist community" and accused the British group of colonialism.

Malta
Applicants can change their official documents by simply filing an affidavit with a notary, eliminating any requirement for medical gender reassignment procedures under the Gender Identity, Gender Expression And Sex Characteristics Act, enacted in April 2015.

Nordic countries 
In June 2014, the Danish Parliament voted 59–52 to remove the requirement of a mental disorder diagnosis and surgery with irreversible sterilization during the process of a legal sex change. Since 1 September 2014, Danes over 18 years of age who wish to apply for a legal sex change can do so by stating that they want to change their documentation, followed by a six-month-long "reflection period" to confirm the request.

On 18 March 2016, the Conservative-led Solberg Government in Norway introduced the Gender Recognition Act which allows legal gender changes without psychiatric or psychological evaluation, diagnosis or medical intervention, by people aged at least 16. Minors aged between 6 and 16 may transition with parental consent. The bill was approved by a vote of 79–13 by Parliament on 6 June, supported by the Conservative Party, the Labour Party, the Progress Party, the Liberal Party, the Socialist Left Party and the Green Party. It was promulgated on 17 June and took effect on 1 July 2016. The act was hailed as an important milestone for LGBTIQ+ rights by LGBTIQ+ rights organizations such as the Norwegian Organisation for Sexual and Gender Diversity, by Amnesty International and by the feminist movement, notably by the Norwegian Association for Women's Rights.

In 2019, Icelandic Prime Minister Katrín Jakobsdóttir proposed a bill to introduce gender recognition via statutory declaration in the country. The bill was passed by the Althing by a vote of 45–0, with three abstentions.

In 2015, the Löfven Government in Sweden introduced a bill allowing legal gender change without any form of psychiatric or psychological evaluation as well as removing the requirement of a diagnosis or any kind of medical intervention. However, the proposals than stagnated in early draft form for several years. In November 2021, the Swedish government announced that it had prepared a new draft bill that would implement self-determination by 2024. The Green Party said that they would vote in favour of the bill, while the Centre Party, Left Party, and Liberals expressed support for the bill. The Sweden Democrats said they would oppose the bill, while the Moderate Party and the Christian Democrats said they would wait until the bill was formally tabled in Parliament to decide their position. A 2021 study by Sifo and commissioned by RFSL found that 61% of Swedes supported moving to a system of self-declaration, with 71% of women and 51% of men in support of the change.
A more recent poll by Fokus Novus however, showed a low support for selfID in Sweden. Only 15% of respondents were positive and among the most critical were parents of minors still living at home.   

In 2021, a citizen's initiative to change the law on legal gender recognition in Finland to a basis of self-determination received 50,000 signatures and was referred to the Finnish Parliament's Committee on Social Affairs and Health. Finnish Prime Minister Sanna Marin had previously expressed support for moving to a self-determination system. On 1 February 2023, Finland's Parliament has voted 113-69 in favor of gender self-identification

Portugal 
In May 2016, the Left Bloc introduced a bill to allow legal gender change solely based on self-determination. Similar bills were introduced by the People–Animals–Nature party and the Costa Government in November 2016 and May 2017, respectively. They were merged into one measure by a parliamentary committee and subsequently approved by the Parliament on 13 April 2018. However, President Marcelo Rebelo de Sousa vetoed the bill. Later in 2018, the Parliament adopted the bill with changes with regards to sex changes by minors aged 16 and 17, suggested by the President in his veto message. This time around, the President signed the bill on 31 July. It was published as Act No. 38/2018 in the official journal on 7 August 2018 and took effect the next day on 8 August.

Spain 
Spain passed gender self-identification in February 2023, via the Ley trans passed by the Congress of Deputies. The draft had been in the making since 2021, as a part of a political agreement between the Socialist Party and its junior coalition partner , En Comú Podem, and Galicia en Común. It set a minimum age of 14, though those 14 through 16 need parental approval. A previous bill giving children total freedom of legal gender recognition had been rejected in May. LGBTQ+ campaigners criticized the new bill for having age limits and for not having provision for non-Spanish residents and non-binary identities. A collective of about 50 feminist groups opposed the bill, concerned about "protection of the specific rights against gender-based oppression".

Switzerland 
In May 2018, the Federal Council proposed amending Swiss legislation to allow transgender individuals to change their registered gender and first name(s) without "red tape", simply by making a declaration to civil status registry officials. In late 2020, the bill was passed by the Swiss Parliament, with all individuals over the age 16 allowed legal gender recognition via self-declaration from 1 January 2022. The bill consisted in a modification of the Swiss Civil Code. It does not allow a change to a nonbinary gender.

United Kingdom 
In Great Britain (but not Northern Ireland), the Equality Act 2010 provides protection from discrimination under the protected characteristic of "gender re-assignment," which includes "any stage in the transition process – from proposing to reassign your gender, to undergoing a process to reassign your gender, or having completed it," This is not equivalent to gender self identification and allows providers of sex-segregated services to deny access to transgender people on a case-by-case basis of "a proportionate means of achieving a legitimate aim".

In 2016, the House of Commons' Women and Equalities Committee issued a report recommending that the Gender Recognition Act 2004 be updated "in line with the principles of gender self-declaration". Later in 2016, in England and Wales, a proposal was developed under Theresa May's government to revise the Act to introduce self-identification, but it was dropped in 2020 after opposition. Instead, Boris Johnson's government reduced the cost of application to £5, and the procedure to apply was moved online.

In 2018, a YouGov poll for PinkNews of 1688 people across the United Kingdom found that 18% favoured self-identification, 58% said medical approval was needed, with the remainder undecided.

A 2018 government consultation received 102,833 submissions from the public; of these, 39% were submitted via an online form set up by equality charity Stonewall, 7% via a form set up by feminist organisation Level Up, and 18% from a form set up by women's campaign group Fair Play for Women. Out of these submissions, 64% said that there should not be a requirement for a diagnosis of gender dysphoria, 80% were in favour of removing the requirement for a medical report, and 77% were in favour of removing the requirement for people to evidence living "in their acquired gender for a period of time".

In 2020, Human Rights Watch called for the British government to "uphold the United Kingdom’s human rights obligations by reforming the Gender Recognition Act (GRA) to allow for self-identification and recognition of transgender and non-binary people."

In March 2021, the Welsh government's Independent LGBTQ+ Expert Panel called for the British government to reform the Act "in accordance with the principle of self-determination." Later in 2021, the Welsh government called for "devolution of as many aspects as possible of the Gender Recognition Act." In Scotland, where legal gender recognition is devolved,  the government was moving forward with self-identification legislation that would also reduce the minimum age for applicants from 18 to 16.

On 22 December 2022, the Scottish Parliament passed the Gender Recognition Reform Bill by a margin of 86 votes for and 39 votes against. On 17 January 2023, the United Kingdom government used section 35 of the Scotland Act 1998 to block the bill from receiving royal assent, the first time section 35 has been used. After the Scottish Parliament vote, Mark Drakeford, First Minister of Wales, expressed a desire for a similar reform of gender-recognition law in Wales and the legislative competence for the Senedd to enact it; he described Westminster's section 35 order as a "very dangerous precedent" for devolution.

Oceania

Australia
In Australia, Tasmania implemented self-declaration in 2019. In 2020, the Tasmania Law Reform Institute completed an investigation of the law's impact that "uncovered no evidence that allowing people to change their officially recorded gender would have any unforeseen legal consequences." Later in 2019, the Parliament of Victoria introduced a law that abolished the sex reassignment surgery requirement for legal gender change and allows applicants to self-nominate the sex listed on their birth registration as male, female, or any other gender diverse or non-binary descriptor of their choice.

New Zealand
In New Zealand, gender markers on passports and drivers licences have worked on a self-declaration basis since 2012. In November 2017, the New Zealand Parliament introduced the Births, Deaths, Marriages, and Relationships Registration Bill to allow people to change the sex on their birth certificates on a self-declaration basis as well. The bill passed its first reading in December 2017 and passed its second reading in August 2021. The bill was unanimously approved by Parliament on its third reading and will come into effect in 2023. The Human Rights Commission has supported the bill, stating that it would "ultimately help reduce discrimination." The bill has also been supported by the Māori Women's Welfare League and the National Council of Women of New Zealand.

Academic research 
A 2019 paper in International Journal of Environmental Research and Public Health said that several studies have found that legal gender recognition frameworks based on pathologization can have negative effects on transgender and intersex individuals. A 2018 study in BMC International Health and Human Rights said that "in most countries where transgender people are refused legal recognition of their gender identity, this might lead to further human rights violations, impacting their access to education, employment, healthcare, social security, and legal protection" and that "many countries that do permit the modification of gender markers on identity documents impose abusive requirements, such as forced or otherwise involuntary surgery, medical diagnosis, long, costly and complicated judicial procedures." A 2017 study in Critical Social Policy said that "legal requirements based upon trans-related diagnoses pose a risk of reintroducing surgical and hormonal practices through the back door. Moreover, these diagnoses act as gatekeeper to other healthcare services and citizenship rights." Sex/gender self-determination is now in international public consciousness due to numerous media commentaries, governmental debates and the corresponding and relatively fast-paced shifts in legal and policy constructions regarding trans, sex/gender expansive, and intersex people in law and medicine 

A 2020 study from the University of Bristol found that "being able to change gender legally without having to rely on medical diagnosis and treatment would make older age a much more positive experience for many trans individuals seeking to transition in later life." A 2021 study in Labour Economics found that removal of surgical requirements for legal gender recognition "is associated with an increase in the employment rate of FtM transgender people of around 9 to 20%."

Several researchers have also found that self-identification laws will not necessarily address all issues faced by trans people by themselves, especially if such laws restrict legal gender to a binary or are not accompanied by other reforms, such as in healthcare. A 2018 article from Chris Dietz of the University of Leeds on the legal gender recognition system in Denmark found that "recognition may be practically inaccessible in the absence of corresponding health care provision" and that "positivity around the law was mitigated by contemporaneous reforms taking place in the Danish health care system" which had the effect of certifying "a de facto monopoly for authorising [trans healthcare] treatments at the Sexological Clinic (Sexologisk Klinik) of the National Hospital (Rigshospitalet) in Copenhagen".

Research has also found that legal gender recognition laws based on self-declaration do not necessarily, by themselves, guarantee access to proper identity documentation. A 2014 study on the Argentinian law found that "uptake of this right has not been homogenous," in particular that "foreign born status was a strong negative correlate of new ID acquisition," on top of other challenges faced by immigrants in the country. A 2021 paper in the Journal of Human Rights said that "trans activists in India argue that many authorities claim ignorance of the process, denying and rejecting transgender persons’ applications for identity documents with the justification that they do not know the procedures around providing IDs to persons of 'their gender.'"

A 2020 paper in the Modern Law Review about the proposed reforms to the UK's Gender Recognition act argued that the reforms would not erode the existing exemptions in the 2010 Equality Act permitting a reliance on sex instead of gender identity, and that, based on existing research, they would "not lead to a significant increase in harms to non-trans women." A 2017 paper from Peter Dunne of Trinity College Dublin said that "there is also little (if any) support for the idea that trans protections facilitate cisgender predators who feign a trans identity to perpetrate assaults in women-only space. In reality, concerns over the supposed threat of trans identities often reveal lingering anti-trans prejudice, reproducing historic tropes about the ‘deviant’, ‘deceptive’ or ‘unstable’ trans individual." A 2018 study, from the Williams Institute in the United States, found that passing non-discrimination laws based on self-declared gender identity "is not related to the number or frequency of criminal incidents" in public spaces such as toilets and changing rooms and that "fears of increased safety and privacy violations as a result of nondiscrimination laws are not empirically grounded."

See also
 Feminist views on transgender topics
 Legal status of transgender people
 Transgender people in sports

References

Feminism and transgender
Gender and society
Transgender rights